Markus Zoecke (born 10 May 1968) is a German former professional tennis player. Zoecke's primary weapon was a powerful serve that he could hit thanks to his height (1.95 m). He reached a highest singles ranking of No. 48 in March 1992. During his career he won one singles and one doubles title. He played three matches for the German Davis Cup team in 1992 and 1995.

He is currently the sporting director at the Rot-Weiss Tennis Club in Berlin.

ATP career finals

Singles: 2 (1 title, 1 runner-up)

Doubles: 1 (1 title)

ATP Challenger and ITF Futures finals

Singles: 7 (4–3)

Doubles: 2 (2–0)

Performance timeline

Singles

References

External links
 
 
 

1968 births
Living people
German male tennis players
Tennis players from Berlin
West German male tennis players